Zao Dam is a hollow gravity dam located in Yamagata Prefecture in Japan. The dam is used for flood control and water supply. The catchment area of the dam is 21 km2. The dam impounds about 24  ha of land when full and can store 7300 thousand cubic meters of water. The construction of the dam was started on 1965 and completed in 1969.

References

Dams in Yamagata Prefecture
1969 establishments in Japan